A Massachusetts general election was held on November 7, 1978 in the Commonwealth of Massachusetts.

The election included:
 statewide elections for United States Senator, Governor, Lieutenant Governor, Attorney General, Secretary of the Commonwealth, Treasurer, and Auditor;
 district elections for U.S. Representatives, State Representatives, State Senators, and Governor's Councillors; and
 ballot questions at the state and local levels.

Democratic and Republican candidates were selected in party primaries held September 14, 1978.

Governor & Lieutenant Governor

Democrats Edward J. King and Thomas P. O'Neill III were elected Governor and Lieutenant Governor, respectively, over Republican candidates Francis W. Hatch, Jr. and William I. Cowin.

Attorney General

Democrat Francis X. Belotti was elected Attorney General. He defeated Republican Bill Weld in the general election.

Secretary of the Commonwealth

Incumbent Secretary of the Commonwealth Paul Guzzi sought election to the U.S. Senate, leaving his office vacant for the next term.

State Representative Michael J. Connolly defeated Lois Pines, Anthony J. Vigliotti, James Hennigan, David E. Crosby, William J. Galvin Jr., and John Fulham in the Democratic primary and Republican John W. Sears in the general election.

Democratic primary

Candidates
Michael J. Connolly, State Representative from Roslindale
David E. Crosby
John Fulham
William J. Galvin Jr., son of former Boston City Council President William J. Galvin
James W. Hennigan Jr., former State Senator from Jamaica Plain and member of the Boston School Committee
Lois Pines, State Representative from Newton
Anthony J. Vigliotti, Worcester County Registrar of Deeds

General election

Treasurer and Receiver-General

Incumbent Treasurer and Receiver-General Robert Q. Crane defeated Lawrence DiCara, Paul Cacchiotti, Dayce Moore, Thomas Lopes, and Lawrence Blacke in the Democratic Primary and Republican Lewis Crampton in the general election.

Democratic primary

Candidates
Lawrence Blacke
Paul Cacchiotti
Robert Q. Crane, incumbent Treasurer and Receiver-General since 1964
Lawrence DiCara, President of the Boston City Council
Thomas Lopes, State Representative from New Bedford
Dayce Moore

Results

Auditor

Incumbent Auditor Thaddeus M. Buczko defeated Peter Meade in the Democratic primary and Republican Timothy F. O'Brien in the general election.

O'Brien replaced William A. Casey as the Republican nominee after Casey dropped out of the race. After conservative Edward J. King defeated Michael Dukakis for the Democratic nomination for governor, Casey chose to drop-out and support the anti-abortion King over the pro-choice Republican nominee Francis Hatch.

O'Brien was selected by the State Committee over attorney Ralph Barbagallo, Jr. and William Sargent, the son of former Governor Francis W. Sargent.

Democratic primary

Candidates
Thaddeus M. Buczko, incumbent Auditor
Peter Meade, Boston Parks Commissioner

Results

General election

United States Senator

Democratic Democratic Congressman Paul E. Tsongas was elected over  incumbent Republican Edward Brooke.

References

 
Massachusetts